Johan Josef Krásl (10 August 1899 – 17 March 1980) was a Czech ice hockey player. He competed in the men's tournaments at the 1924 Winter Olympics and the 1928 Summer Olympics.

References

External links

1899 births
1980 deaths
Czech ice hockey forwards
Ice hockey players at the 1924 Winter Olympics
Ice hockey players at the 1928 Winter Olympics
Olympic ice hockey players of Czechoslovakia
People from Chlumec nad Cidlinou
Sportspeople from the Hradec Králové Region
Czechoslovak ice hockey forwards
HC Slavia Praha players